Sri Sri Raghaveshwara Bharathi (originally, Harish Sharma), is an Indian religious guru and the present mathadhis (Guru) of Shri Ramachandrapura Mutt, Hosanagara in Shimoga district in the Indian state of Karnataka. He is the 36th mathadhis of Shri Ramachandrapura Math,.  He took sannyasa from Jagadguru Sri Ragavendra Bharati Mahaswamiji the previous mathadhis, in April 1994. He is a follower of Advaita Vedanta.

Birth and childhood
Sri Bharathi in his early days before taking initiation was known by the name Hareesha Sharma. He was born in the village called Chaduravalli in Sagara, Karnataka .

Education
He studied Vedantha, Yoga, Astrology and Sanskrit in Gokarna and later in Mysore.

Sannyasa and after

On 28 April 1999, Sri Bharati was made pontiff following the sadgati of Jagadguru Shankaracharya Sri Sri Raghavendra Bharathi mahaswamiji

Rape case

Raghaveshwara Bharathi Swamy of the Ramachandrapura Math is accused of raping two people, including a minor. One woman, now in her 50s, had accused the seer of raping her 168 times between 2011 and 2014. The other rape case against Raghaveshwara is by a woman who alleged that he raped her when she was 15. He was acquitted of all the charges and the acquittal upheld by the Karnataka High Court.

Religious thought and social responsibility

He stresses the need to protect Vedic culture, and its activities along with other social activities.

One of the plans instituted by him in the Mutts is Musti Bikshe Yojana wherein each devotee keeps a fist full of rice daily as gift to the Mutt, and collectively later feeds the needy and hunger, as old age orphans, hostels for homeless or at the time of natural calamity, etc.

He frequently conducts Rama Katha (Story of Rama) for the general public — a blend of discourse, dance, music and drawing — all that depict various incidents of Ramayana at various places.

Eye hospital
He established the Bharathiya Nethra Chikitshalya in Mujangavu, Kumbla in Kasaragod dist, to cater the need of rural eye patients, criss-crossing the boundaries of religion in social service.

Preventing Mining at Ambaragudda
Bharathi led a protest march by environmentalists against mining in and around Kodachadri. For opposing mining activities, he has to face the ire of mining agencies.

Under his Project Vanajeevana Yajna, thousands traditional and medicinal plants have been planted. Citizens are encouraged to plant at least five saplings every year under the project.

At 2003, Manganese mining activities started at Ambaragudda (Kodachadri, Karnataka), situated at western ghats (India). Mine owners promised to build hospitals, roads for locals and got an approval for mining of 18 acres. But, they unearthed hundreds of acres of land unofficially. Sri Raghaveshwara Bharathi Swamiji of Ramachandrapura Mutt came to know about this matter and decided to fight against mining at Ambaragudda. He personally visited the place, looked at the casualty and created a stage called Kodachadri Sanjeevini to fight against mining. He brought locals, Forest officials, local MLAs into this stage and protested all over the place. As a result of this movement, forest department forfeit mining machines, equipments and stopped mining activities at Ambaragudda. Officials from Ministry of Environment visited the place and agreed upon casualty done to the environment. State High Court ordered to stop mining activities and encouraged to protect environment. On 16.05.2005, locals and devotees of mutt planted new plants at Ambaragudda. Swamiji had a life threat in this case and Karnataka State Government had appointed a gun man for his security. Today this place is announced as Natural Heritage Site by Biodiversity Board.

Preservation of indigenous cows
Bharathi has campaigned for the preservation of indigenous cow breeds through a programme called "Kamadugha". On 22 April 2007, he led a nine-day Vishwa Go-Sammelan (World Cow Conference).

Projects are on to start 108 goshalas, of which few are already started in Karnataka, Maharashtra, Kerala, Tamil Nadu. This work is highly noted, as so far no institutions in India, govt or NGO's, had started the work. The Mutt has many breeds in its collection. Work is being done to preserve the same for the future. Some rare breeds as Amrithmahal, Vechur, which count less than 100 in numbers, are protected here. He has been working stressing the need to promote products other than milk products, as Go-ark, medicines from cow, Doopa, etc.

He also led and inspired the 108-day-long (30 September 2009 – 17 January 2010 ) 'Vishwa Mangala Gou Grama Yathra' with the support of various saints and Hindu organizations. The yathra covered the whole of India to highlight the importance of preservation and protection of cow with demands such as to declare cow as the national animal of India and to formulate laws to preserve various breeds of Indian cows. It ended with the one of the biggest mass signature campaign signed by over 83 million people across India calling for the end of cruelty to cow and to declare cow a national animal which is then submitted to President of India on 31 January 2010. An 18-member delegation which visited the President of India was led by Bharathi including yoga Guru Baba Ramdev, Pejavara Vishvesha Tirtha, many other senior saints and Shankaracharyas, religious leaders from Islam and Christianity, cow scientists, experts, organic farmers and leaders belonging to various organisations of the country.

Vishwa Mangala Gou Grama Yatra 
Vishwa Mangala Gou Grama Yatra is an initiative organized covering many states which resulted in collection of over eight crores signatures over a petition seeking complete ban on cow slaughter. The petition was later submitted to Mrs. Pratibha Patil, the then President of India.

Vishwa Gou Sammelana 
The World Cow Conference, which is the first of its kind involving the participation of over 20 lakh devotees of indigenous cow lovers from 11 different countries.

Mangala Gou Yatra 
This movement, named after Mangal Pandey, the hero of first freedom struggle of 1857, mainly covered the states of South India and some places in neighboring Maharashtra to create an awakening among the masses on the need to preserve the indigenous cow breeds.

Flood Relief 
Social help like flood relief is another key contribution of the Matha. Sri RamchandrapuraMatha's Bharatiya Gou Parivara team had completed a task of collecting and distributing about 25 loads of fodder, necessary items worth approximately four lakhs, one ton of rice, 18 tonnes of animal fodder, to the flood affected regions all over Karnataka.

Kamadugha’s mission is to achieve this vision through four themes: Protection, Conservation , Awareness, Research 
Kamadugha is a holistic mission of Sri RamachandrapuraMatha to popularise the benefits of protecting and conserving Desi cow (Bos Indicus) to mankind through historical evidence and research based outcomes.

Gouswarga 
The Gouswarga started on 27 May 2018 under the management of Kamadugha Trust®, Sri Ramachandrapura Matha is an initiative for protection and flourishing of indigenous cows in their natural environment.  A natural picturesque beauty, lying amidst the green peaks of Sahyadri mountains, this place is situated in Bhankuli near Siddapura town of Uttara Kannada district, Karnataka. This goushala has 15 different breeds, and about a thousand cattle rearing capacity. About 2.5 acres of pasture is available for grazing freely. Green grass is grown in nearby areas in around 45 acres of land. Cows are not in confinement here; they roam freely in spacious, serene enclosure. Shine or shelter as per their choice.

Vishnugupta VishwaVidyapeetham (VVV) 
VVV is an initiative by SriSri RaghaveshwaraBharati MahaSwamiji, aiming to preserve and promote the glorious traditions of Bharata for the future generations. Here a blend of modern education and traditional education will be taught to students, seeking to imbibe in them knowledge of Indian traditional arts and languages, and the practices of Sanatana Dharma.The main motivation behind the establishment of Vishnugupta Vishwa Vidyapeetham is reclaiming the lost Takshashila in our country. Hence, VVV is named after Chanakya, the greatest guru of Takshashila

Honors

He declined the offer of an honorary doctorate from Gulbarga University in 2013.

Notable disciples
Suresh Oberoi, and Vivek OberoiBollywood actor
Arvind Bhat,PV Sindhu International Badminton players
Rama Jois, Former Chief Justice of the Punjab and Haryana High Court, Former Governor of Jharkhand and Bihar
Radhe Shyam Agarwal, – Indian Entrepreneur, Founder of Emami Industries, Kolkata
Anant Kumar Hegde, Former Union Minister and current MP (Lok Sabha) of Uttara Kannada 
Nalin Kumar Kateel, BJP Karnataka state President
Tejasvi Surya MP Bengaluru South and National President of Bharatiya Janata Yuva Morcha

References

External links

 Official Website of Sri Sri Raghaveshwara Bharathi Swamiji
 “Declare Cow and its progeny National Animal” –Sri Sri Raghaveshwara Bharathi

Advaitin philosophers
Hindu philosophers and theologians
People from Shimoga district
Living people
Hindu activists
Shankaracharyas
Activists from Karnataka
Indian Hindu monks
Year of birth missing (living people)